Laze pri Dramljah is a settlement in the Municipality of Šentjur in eastern Slovenia. It lies just south of Dramlje. The A1 motorway crosses the settlement's territory south of the village. The settlement, and the entire municipality, are included in the Savinja Statistical Region, which is in the Slovenian portion of the historical Duchy of Styria.

Name
The name of the settlement was changed from Laze to Laze pri Dramljah in 1955.

Church
The local parish church is dedicated to Mary Magdalene and belongs to the Roman Catholic Diocese of Celje. It dates to the mid-18th century.

References

External links
Laze pri Dramljah at Geopedia

Populated places in the Municipality of Šentjur